Pseuderesia eleaza, the variable harlequin, is a butterfly in the family Lycaenidae. It is found in Guinea-Bissau, Sierra Leone, Liberia, Ivory Coast, Ghana, Benin, Nigeria, Cameroon, Equatorial Guinea, the Republic of the Congo, the Democratic Republic of the Congo, Uganda and Tanzania. Its habitat consists of forests.

Subspecies
Pseuderesia eleaza eleaza (Guinea-Bissau, Sierra Leone, Liberia, Ivory Coast, Ghana, Benin, southern Nigeria, Cameroon, Equatorial Guinea, Congo, Democratic Republic of the Congo: Uele, Tshopo, Equateur and Sankuru)
Pseuderesia eleaza katera Stempffer, 1961 (Uganda, Democratic Republic of the Congo: Uele and Kivu, north-western Tanzania)

References

Butterflies described in 1873
Poritiinae
Butterflies of Africa
Taxa named by William Chapman Hewitson